The Elko Formation, also known as Elko Shale(s), is an oil shale geologic formation in Elko County, northern Nevada, United States. The deltaic and lacustrine shales and limestones preserve fossils dating back to the Middle Eocene of the Paleogene to Middle Miocene of the Neogene period. The frog genus Elkobatrachus and ant species Pseudocamponotus elkoanus were named after the formation.

Description 
The formation ranges in age from the Middle Eocene (Uintan), with the underlying lower member dated at 46.1 ± 0.1 Ma and the upper member of the Eocene section dated at 38.9 ± 0.3 Ma.

A younger section is dated to the Late Eocene to Early Oligocene (37.2 to 28.4 Ma) and the Elko Shale member is dated to the Middle Miocene (16.0 to 11.6 Ma).

Fossil content 
The following fossils were reported from the formation:
 Elkobatrachus brocki
 Miopelodytes gilmorei
 Pseudocamponotus elkoanus
 Candona sp.
 Lymnaea sp.
 Sphaerium sp.
 ?Pontoniella sp.

See also 

 List of fossiliferous stratigraphic units in Nevada
 Paleontology in Nevada
 Oil shale
 Middle Eocene Climatic Optimum
 Middle Miocene disruption

References

Further reading 
 A. C. Henrici and S. R. Haynes. 2006. Elkobatrachus brocki, a new pelobatid (Amphibia: Anura) from the Eocene Elko Formation of Nevada. Annals of Carnegie Museum 75(1):11-35
 E. H. Taylor. 1941. A new anuran from the middle Miocene of Nevada. University of Kansas Science Bulletin 27(4):61-69
 F. M. Carpenter. 1930. The Fossil Ants of North America. Bulletin of the Museum of Comparative Zoology, Harvard University 70:1-66

Geologic formations of Nevada
Paleogene geology of Nevada
Neogene geology of Nevada
Eocene Series of North America
Oligocene Series of North America
Miocene Series of North America
Uintan
Lutetian Stage
Bartonian Stage
Priabonian Stage
Rupelian Stage
Chattian Stage
Aquitanian (stage)
Burdigalian
Langhian
Serravallian
Shale formations of the United States
Limestone formations
Deltaic deposits
Lacustrine deposits
Oil shale in the United States
Oil shale formations
Fossiliferous stratigraphic units of North America
Paleontology in Nevada
Geography of Elko County, Nevada